The Glen-Holly Hotel was a hotel that was built in 1895 in Southern California.

Glen Holly Hotel was just north of Prospect Avenue, now Hollywood Boulevard on Ivar Avenue at Yucca. 

The Glen-Holly Hotel was the first hotel to be constructed in the Hollywood district of Los Angeles County. It was built by Joakim Berg, a noted artist of the 1890s in the region. At its opening it had 20 rooms and one bath. A horse carriage called a tallyho took guests from downtown LA to the hotel. 

The original owner, Mr. Charles M. Pierce, also became the operator of the Los Angeles Pacific Railroad's Balloon Route in  1904, the line opened in September 1901. The hotel was a stop on the line going from downtown Los Angeles to West Los Angeles and the beaches on the west side. The Balloon Route used the hotel as lunch stop.

D. L. Allen later took over management of the Glen-Holly Tavern. He added billiard hall, bowling alley, and livery service.

It became a landmark of the area, though was later demolished.

References

Hotels in Los Angeles
Defunct organizations based in Hollywood, Los Angeles
Hotel buildings completed in 1895
1895 establishments in California
Demolished hotels in Los Angeles
Defunct hotels in Los Angeles